Geoff(rey) or Jeff(rey) Bowen may refer to:

Geoffrey Bowen, character in Underbelly Files: Infiltration
Captain Geoffrey Bowen in Battle of Wau
Jeff Bowen (born 1971), American composer, lyricist
Jeffrey Bowen, American record producer and songwriter